Star Wars Insider is the official Star Wars magazine. It began in 1987 as the official magazine of The Lucasfilm Fan Club, and was renamed in 1994 to coincide with the release of Star Wars: TIE Fighter.

Its contents include stories, articles relating to the Star Wars universe, letters, and the fan newsletter "Bantha Tracks". In March 2008, Star Wars Insider reached one hundred issues.

Content
Star Wars Insider has sections that detail updates in the Star Wars universe, news about events, fan fiction, exclusive previews, articles that explore the Star Wars universe, questions and answers, excerpts from comics and books, and interviews. Often it has many humorous comics and stories. Recently, it has retained a humorous air, especially with their now-defunct "Dear 2-1B" column. The magazine also features advertising for many things, (Star Wars-related and non-Star Wars), and a catalog of Star Wars merchandise. One of the sections is called "Bantha Tracks", which is created entirely by the fans.

Publishers
The magazine is currently edited by Jonathan Wilkins. It has been published by many different companies. But at Star Wars Celebration IV, Star Wars Insider relaunched under the new publisher: Titan Magazines.

Star Wars Insider is not delivered to Germany as this country has its own licensed publication, Star Wars -- Das offizielle Magazin. The same was true of the UK until Titan Magazines took over Star Wars Insider in 2007 and merged it with the UK Star Wars Magazine.

References

External links
 
 
 Bantha Tracks

Film magazines published in the United States
Magazines established in 1987
Science fiction-related magazines
Star Wars fandom
Titan Magazines titles